Xu Weizhou (born October 20, 1994), known internationally as Timmy Xu, is a Chinese actor and singer-songwriter, best known for playing the character Bai Luoyin in the Chinese web series Addicted. He was the first artist to achieve the top spots on the Billboard China V chart and Mandarin chart within the same week. Xu was the first solo artist from mainland China to hold a concert in South Korea, and to be officially invited as a guest to the Billboard Music Awards in 2017.

Early life and education
Since childhood, Xu has pursued various artistic endeavors including dancing, singing, music composition, and playing instruments, especially the guitar. He learned Latin dance for more than ten years and won the gold award from the Imperial Society of Teachers of Dancing (ISTD). In high school, Xu formed two rock bands with some of his schoolmates, namely: "EggAche" and a death metal rock band "PROME", in which he was the lead guitarist. "PROME" won the Midi High School band competition in Shanghai. Moreover, he, together with his band, organized and arranged a winter vacation music festival in Shanghai and was featured in the local newspaper. Xu graduated from the Affiliated Senior High School of the Shanghai Theatre Academy. In college, he went to the National Academy of Chinese Theatre Arts in Beijing and graduated in May 2017.

Career

2015–2016: Career beginnings, Addicted and rising popularity
While still in college, Xu debuted in a short film called Gaming Madness as one of the leads in October 2015. He participated in various photo shoots that led him to be discovered and scouted as one of the main leads for a web series called Addicted, broadcast in January 2016. He was also chosen to compose and sing the opening and closing theme songs of Addicted. The full episodes were later uploaded on YouTube, which made the lead actors popular locally and internationally. Afterwards, Xu began to focus on his music career and on May 1, 2016, released his first album entitled Light and started his Asian concert tours from June to August 2016.

Xu also participated in various fashion magazine photo shoots. Later, he raised his profile and earned numerous awards as "Best New Artist". He was named as one of the Top 20 Most Popular Celebrities on Weibo by Sina Weibo Data Center, and earned the title of "New Trend Idol of the year" from Star Magazine. Moreover, his growing popularity resulted in first places on several polls. He was invited as a guest to a sundry of radio shows like Billboard Radio China, TofuPOP Radio – BEC Tero Radio in Thailand, Yang Lan 8 p.m. Show, Hongdou Live Interview, FM 101.7 Music Kaleidoscope, and NetEase Cloud Music (Xu Weizhou Cold Jokes), as well as web shows and live streaming events.

On December 8, he released his single "Fun" which ranked first on several charts. The official music video was released on December 15. His growing popularity also ranked him 37th place on the 2016 Top 50 Most Internet & Business Celebrity Influencers in China by Data Win.

2017: Variety show debut and miscellaneous activities
In late January, Xu made his first official variety appearance on Intangible Her, broadcast on Tencent Video. His successful variety show debut made him reach fifth place on the Top 10 Most Popular Variety Stars in the first half of the year. Later in March, Xu sang the Chinese version of "The Heroes", the theme song of Canadian film Snowtime! by Simple Plan, where he topped on the Billboard China V chart and Mandarin chart within the same week for the second time. He also performed the song live with the rock band on March 4 in Beijing. In addition, the Canadian Embassy and Children's Film Association granted him an ambassadorial award to "China-Canada Cultural Exchange" and "Children's Film Promotion" during the film's press conference.

On April 1, Xu appeared as a guest on the music show Global Chinese Music Chart (currently airing on CCTV15), performing his song "Fun". He was then selected to sing "Screaming Night", the theme song for the 2017 iQiyi Screaming Night Concert, where its music video was released.

In May, he was officially appointed as the "Starlight" ambassador and was the first mainland artist to be invited to the Billboard Music Awards in Las Vegas. Afterwards, he played the main character for a Vogue film project called Seize the Moment, a short film which debuted during the Cannes Film Festival.

After the success of Light, he released the first quarter of his second solo album entitled The Time on August 10, which sold more than 450,000 copies and was certified double platinum. The second quarter was released online for free on October 20, on his 23rd birthday, while the third quarter was released on December 12. He was also chosen to sing the theme song for a British-Chinese action thriller film S.M.A.R.T. Chase entitled "Ruins of Time" on August 23; it was written by Jay Chou, a famous singer. His songs "So What", "Leave Me Alone", and "Ruins of Time" ranked first to third place respectively on the YinYueTai China V Chart for most viewed music videos, for the 38th and 39th week consecutively.

On September 1, he launched his first photo book entitled "This is Timmy" published by Jingdong. Later, CCTV officially announced that Xu was one of the hundred singers to sing the "China" song for celebrating the 40th anniversary of China's reforms. He also attended the annual Anhui TV Drama Awards on December 16.

Sina Weibo revealed the "2017 Popular Star" list and Xu was placed 10th on the Top 10 stars with the highest reposts, with 65.99 million. His post in Sanya was placed 10th on the Top 10 most popular posts with 6.69 million fan interactions. Moreover, 15 Minutes for Craziness ranked fourth on the Top 10 music topics, with 380 million views. His music video "The Heroes", which was posted on Sina Music, was also placed fourth on the Top 10 popular music chart with 0.6 million likes/reposts/comments.

2018: TV drama debut 
20th Century Fox announced that Xu was selected to sing the Chinese promotional song "Maze", produced by Harvey Mason Jr., for the American film Maze Runner: The Death Cure. He was invited to participate in the Chinese Spring Festival Galas of three famous China TV stations: Dragon Television, Anhui Television, and Beijing Television. On January 31, he released the final quarter of The Time, "15 Minutes for Fantasy". After The Time was completely released online, he held the press conference for its physical album in Taiwan on February 3.

In April, he joined the SuperdrySounds project, performing in the launching global party in London, and at the Strawberry Music Festival in Shanghai later that month. Xu started filming for new drama series My Girlfriend on April 16.

In May, Xu made his TV variety show debut when he guest-starred in Give Me Five on Zhejiang TV for two episodes. Later, the digital version of The Time was officially released in Thailand on May 16 and it instantly ranked first on iTunes. On May 26, Xu held the Bangkok concert of his second Asia Tour. On May 28, Tencent announced Xu as their new spokesperson for short video app Weishi.

In June, Xu was placed third on the 100 Asian Heartthrobs of 2018 ranked by Starmometer.

In July, Xu joined Shake It Up, a dance variety show on Shanghai TV, winning the second place in the final round of the competition. On July 5, the physical album of The Time started presale on JD.com, and sold more than 13,000 copies within one hour. On July 10, the Taiwanese version of the physical album of The Time started presale and instantly ranked first on the sales chart. Later, Entertainment Star Business revealed the 2018 Star Commercial Value List, in which Xu ranked first on the Top Potential Artist. He also ranked in the 2018 Forbes 30 under 30 China artist list.

In October, Xu attended the 5th Silk Road International Film Festival closing ceremony and performed his song "Glory". On October 20, he held a free concert on his 24th birthday at the Olympic Sports Center Gymnasium in Beijing and also released a new song, "Everything About You", for his fans. He was ranked 70th on the Top 100 Most Commercial Value Chinese Star in 2018.

On November 19, it was announced that Xu had been cast in the sports drama Ping Pong. Later, he was selected to sing the theme song for the China's Communist Youth League, and China's 40 years of Reform Celebration. In December, he attended the Beijing Television's 2019 New Year Global Gala.

2019–present: Movie debut 
In April, Xu started filming for new TV series Dear Mayang Street. Later, he was selected to sing the theme song for the China's Youth Integrity Education.

In May, Xu attended the Hunan TV Gala for the 100th anniversary of the May Fourth Movement as a representative of outstanding young actors. In addition, he attended the Beijing Winter Olympics Countdown 1,000 days ceremony as their ambassador. This was the first time Xu was the MC for the event, where he performed his song "Glory" on the stage.

In June, he was appointed as the Youth Film A Project Ambassador of Shanghai International Film Festival.

Fashion

2016 
In 2016, Xu was invited as one of the guests to several fashion ceremonies held in China, including Madame Figaro, the French Excellence Awards, the 4th anniversary of OK! Magazine Awards, Damiani's Dinner Party, the Versace 7 Bags for 7 Cities exhibition, the iFeng Fashion Choice Awards, the PEACEBIRD Woman 2017 S/S Fashion Show, L'Officiel'''s fashion night, the BVLGARI x Vogue GEM DREAM exhibition, Vogue's 11th anniversary ceremony, the Sina Weibo fan carnival, Bazaar's Men of the Year, the 13th Esquire Man at His Best Award Ceremony, the Trendshealth award ceremony, the ELLE Style Awards ceremony, and the Shanghai Divine Michelangelo exhibition.

In July, China Luxury, Beauty and Fashion Insights published the Top 100 Most Valuable Fashion Influencers based on Key Opinion Leader Index (KOLs) and he ranked fourth on Weibo's celebrities category. In addition, Timmy Xu Limited Edition Eyeglasses, launched by INMIX, become a best-selling series with 4,672 pieces.

 2017 
In 2017, Xu was featured in the first front cover of "Men's Uno Young", a brand new magazine for China's post-90s generation. Its photographs were also published in Men's Uno Taiwan limited edition. Later on, he was invited to Vogue's Condé Nast Century exhibition, the Hong Kong Kenzo grand opening, the Shanghai Longines Global Champions Tour, the Tiffany & Co night party, the Fendi PEEKABOO exhibition, the Vogue film premiere, the London Superdry music party, Valentino's I Love Spike, Mika Ninagawa's exhibition, the 14th Esquire Man at His Best Award Ceremony, Grazia's 60th Anniversary Street Fashion Power exhibition, L'Officiel's fashion night, the Men's Uno Young Anniversary Party, and Bazaar's 150th anniversary exhibition.

In addition, he was officially invited by Givenchy as a guest to its F/W 2017 Men's Paris Fashion Week in France. On top of that, his digital fashion video became a hot trending topic during that time.  It also broke the record in the social posts and views with more than 500 million readings. On March 8, he was invited by Moncler Gamme Rouge and Louis Vuitton to the F/W 2017 Women's Paris Fashion Week.

In April, he was officially announced as an ambassador for the 14th anniversary of Men's Health and Italian luxury brand Fendi in June, as their new power brand ambassador. Later, Givenchy decided to opt him, a KOLs who is especially popular among millennials, for promoting the Chinese Mother's Day campaign. He was also reported as one of the most famous faces in China's activewear market and one of the most influential fashion stars in China's luxury market by New York Digital Marketing Agency. Afterwards, INMIX, an eyewear brand, released a set of Timmy's exclusive emoticon from the privilege granted by Emoji. Subsequently, he was invited to the Louis Vuitton S/S 2018 Men's Paris Fashion Week on June 22, the Coach S/S 2018 Women's New York Fashion Week on September 12, and Givenchy S/S 2018 Women's Paris Fashion Week on October 1.

He was the first Chinese star to become the face of South Korean cosmetics brand Laneige in China. Moreover, Bomoda China's Key Opinion Leader Index (KOLs) in the first half of 2017 reported that Xu was first on the Top 30 Most Influential Social Celebrities and fourth place on Top 10 Potential Celebrities in China's consumer marketplace. On October 23, Xu, together with Dunhill and China's Esquire, released a special short fashion film called "Urban Symphony", shot in Hungary. A yearly report on the jewellery market, by L2's Digital IQ Index: Luxury China, mentioned that Tiffany & Co increased engagement on Weibo due to their online promotions featuring Xu.

On November 20, he was invited as one of special guests to attend the annual Victoria's Secret Fashion Show held in Shanghai and his look was listed in British GQ's 10 best-dressed men in the world that week. In December, Xu was announced to be the first mainland artist to have the collaboration project with the British international branded clothing Superdry. Their limited collection sold out within 100 seconds at Tmall and two hours at the Beijing, Shanghai, and Chengdu stores. His appearance on the Men's Uno cover was listed ninth on the Top 10 Best Men Fashion Magazine Covers of The Year by famous fashion blog FashionModels.

 2018 
In 2018, China's COACH officially appointed him as their first Coach Men spokesman on January 4. Later, Xu, as Fendi's new power brand ambassador, attended Fendi's F/W 2018 Men's Milan Fashion Week. He also attended Alexander McQueen's F/W 2018 Men's Paris Fashion Week as the first Chinese male artist officially invited. Later, he was officially announced as the new style brand ambassador for Tiffany & Co., and a global spokesperson for British brand Superdry.

He was invited to Laneige's Cushion Dream Factory Night, the Fendi Newsstand event, Shanghai's Superdry Sounds party, Daniel Wellington's My Classic Night Out, the Coach x Disney Dark Fairytale, Vogue's film premier, the Men's Uno Sport Event, Nylon's 1st anniversary party, Elle's 30th anniversary ceremony, the Laneige x Line Friends event, Shanghai's Tiffany & Co. Paper Flowers Party, and Hong Kong's Roberto Cavalli event. On April 11, he attended Superdry Sounds global party in London as Global Brand Ambassador. On May 3, he appeared at the Tiffany & Co. flagship store at Fifth Avenue, New York City, to attend the Tiffany Paper Flower ceremony as Brand Style Ambassador. On May 19, Xu attended the launch ceremony of Libert'aime by Forevermark as the first Light Icon of the brand. The limited "Le Light x Xu Weizhou" collection sold out quickly in the online presale. On June 24, Xu attended the Dunhill 2019 S/S fashion show in Paris.

Xu featured on the cover of the June/July issue of Elle Men Hong Kong, his third time on the cover of the magazine in three years. He was listed in the "Top 10 rising Asian stars taking over the fashion scene". L2's Digital IQ Index 2018 reported that Laneige was ranked seventh on the Top 10 Beauty Brands in China, including COACH and Valentino, which were ranked fourth and eighth respectively, because of Xu's ability to achieve high engagement on Weibo. He is the first male artist to be featured on the cover of the two newest magazines GQ Sport and NewOne.

In September, China's famous sportswear & footwear brand Belle International announced him as their new ambassador. Xu attended the Balmain S/S 2019 Women's Paris Fashion Week on September 28. Chinese famous magazine Bella reported that the cover of Xu Weizhou got their best selling online in 2018.

 2019 
In 2019, the Annual China Entertainment Index by AI Man Data revealed that Xu was ranked fifth on the 2018 Top 10 Influential Fashion Male Artists list. On January 27, It was revealed that Xu was ranked fourth and ninth for COACH and Tiffany & Co respectively on the Top 20 Most Valuable Celebrity Brand Endorsers of 2018. On April, I-MAGAZINE revealed the Best Fashion Face Award Year 2018 – Xu was ranked 50th.

On June 18, Fendi officially announced Xu as their first Peekaboo Spokesperson in China. He also walked the runway at the Fendi F/W 2019–2020 Women's and Men's Collection Show in Shanghai and the Fendi S/S 2020 Men's Milan Fashion Week as the new spokesperson.

Philanthropy

 2016 
In 2016, Xu was appointed as a national ambassador to some charities including "Against Domestic Violence", "Rio Run", "Animal Welfare Charities" by Cabbeen, "Lucky Cat Welfare Organizations", "Hope For Home For Children" by the China Charities Aid Foundation For Children, "Moon bear protecting" by the Animals Asia Foundation (AAF), "1,000 rabbits look up at the moon" by the China Social Welfare Foundation, "Adopt pets instead of purchasing" by the Beijing Non-profit Adoption organizations, "Charity Stars: Love can touch" by Harper's Bazaar, and "Door of charity" by the China Children and Teenagers' Fund (CCTF).

He is also the founder for "Light of love for the blind", and "10.20 km run to the light for the blind". In addition, he joined the Kering Foundation's campaign of anti-violence against women.

 2017 
In 2017, he continued his charitable efforts by participating in "Wuxi Marathon" by Men's Health'', "amfAR", "World Book Day – Read to Lead" by the Xinhua News Agency, "Love the Earth" by the New Media Exhibition of Global Sustainable Development, "Youth Attitudes – One Hundred Thousand Young People" by NetEase, "Child Welfare & Protection Week" by the China Ministry of Civil Affairs and UNICEF, "Release An Aquatic Animal to Protect Natural Resources" by the Alibaba Foundation, "Caring for People with A Spinal Cord Injury" by WeiboFit, China Foundation for Disabled Person and Xinhua News Agency, "Make A Promise – Lockit Series" by Louis Vuitton and UNICEF, and "Cat & Dog Daily – Adopt pets" by NetEase.

Moreover, he has been the ambassador for "Adopt A Green Plant for Green Earth" by the Campus Public Welfare Foundation, "Caring for Disabled Children" by the Beijing Foundation for Disabled Person, "Caring for Blind Children" by the Sina Micro-Philanthropy, "Boiling Point Public Welfare" by Baidu, and "I want to go to school" by Music Radio – China National Radio (CNR) and the China Children and Teenagers' Fund (CCTF).

Later in July, the China Charities Aid Foundation for Children announced Xu's appointment as a charity ambassador for the "Hope For Home For Children" project for two years consecutively. On October 20, Shanghai Fire Department appointed him as their official firefighter ambassador to promote the external activities and services.

In November, he was appointed as the Ice and Snow ambassador for SINA's sport classroom. In addition, Sina Weibo revealed that Xu's charity activities became one of the 10 most influential charitable topics of 2017.

2018 
In 2018, Xu joined Netease's charity program as the ambassador for a book donating project for the kids in rural areas. In August, he was officially appointed as the National Winter Sports promotion ambassador for the 2022 Winter Olympics in Beijing.

In September, Xu became TRENDSHEALTH's Pink ribbon ambassador to raise awareness of breast cancer. In October, The European Travel Commission (ETC), co-funded by European Union, appointed him as their EU-China Tourism Year ambassador to promote tourism in the EU.

2019 
In 2019, Xu was ranked eighth on the 2018 Top 10 Public Welfare Influential Male Artists list, revealed by the Annual China Entertainment Index. On March 18, Xu was appointed as China's science fiction ambassador for the National Science Popularization. On March 30, he attended the Lights-Out of Earth Hour – Connect to Earth Charity Program for promoting the environment's protection. In May, he was selected to be the ambassador of "Sunshine of Love", a project for disabled people in China.

Personal life
On March 9, 2022, Xu announced his marriage to his non-celebrity wife, whom he dated for 4 years.

Filmography

Films

Television series

Documentary

Variety shows

Discography

Studio albums

Extended plays

Singles

Soundtrack appearances

Other appearances

Music videos

Concerts and tours

Awards and nominations

References

External links
Xu Weizhou's personal Sina Weibo 
Xu Weizhou's personal Instagram
Xu Weizhou's official Youtube channel

1994 births
Male actors from Shanghai
Living people
Singers from Shanghai
21st-century Chinese male actors
Chinese male film actors
Chinese male television actors
National Academy of Chinese Theatre Arts alumni
21st-century Chinese male singers